Umber is a brown or reddish-brown earth pigment.

Umber or Umbers may also refer to:

Places
Umber Island, Antarctica

People with the name
Mark Umbers (born 1973), English actor
Richard Umbers (bishop) (born 1971), auxiliary bishop-elect of the Roman Catholic Archdiocese of Sydney
Richard Umbers (footballer) (born 1968), former Australian rules footballer

Arts, entertainment, and media
Umber (album), 1989 debut album of the American post-hardcore band Bitch Magnet
 Umber, a Northern House in A Song of Ice and Fire and its adaptations

See also
Ember
Umbar, a land in J. R. R. Tolkien's fantasy universe